Hans Stanley, PC (23 September 1721 – 12 January 1780) was a British diplomat and politician who sat in the House of Commons between   1743 and 1780.

Early life
Stanley was christened on 9 October 1721 at St Martin-in-the-Fields, London. He was elected as an MP for St. Albans at a by-election on 11 February 1743, and sat for it until the general election in 1747. He had no place in the next parliament, and for a time considered abandoning parliamentary life for diplomacy. He travelled frequently in France, resided for two years at Paris, and studied the law of nations. At the general election of 15 April 1754 he was elected in the Tory interest by the borough of Southampton, and represented it continuously until his death.

Peace negotiator

Hearing from Lord Temple of Pitt's good opinion of him, he recounted in a letter to Pitt of 18 April 1761, his claims to employment should it be desired to open negotiations with France. He was at that time a follower of the Duke of Newcastle, but Pitt enlisted his services, ‘from opinion of his abilities.’ Stanley set out for Calais to meet the French agent on 24 May 1761. Early in the next month he arrived at Paris, and was appointed as Chargé d'affaires at the Embassy to France. He was the representative of the British government in trying to negotiate a peace agreement with France to bring to an end the Seven Years' War. There he remained until 20 September 1761, when it became clear that the mission had ended in failure.

He was appointed to the Lords Commissioners of the Admiralty on 17 June 1762 and became a member of the Privy Council in November of that year. On 7 April 1763 he sent a spirited letter to George Grenville, who was then in office, and to whom he was then attached, declining a seat at the treasury, and setting out how his claims had been neglected. Next August he was at Compiègne. He solicited and obtained in July 1764 the post of Governor of the Isle of Wight or Vice Admiral and constable of Carisbrook Castle. Mary Hervey described the governorship as ‘a very honourable, very convenient employment for him, and also very lucrative.’ At Steephill Manor, on the site of the present castle, near Ventnor, he built a cottage in 1770 at considerable expense, and he entertained there several foreign ambassadors. He resided there until his death in 1780.

Later life
From 1766 to 1767 he was an Ambassador from the United Kingdom to Russia. Stanley was the Cofferer of the Household for two terms: 1766–1774 and 1776–1780. 
 
Hans Stanley committed suicide by cutting his throat, " in a sudden fit of frenzy", at Althorp, the home of John Spencer, 1st Earl Spencer in Northamptonshire.

He was the grandson of Sir Hans Sloane and the first cousin one time removed of John 'Mad Jack' Fuller.

See also
 List of Ambassadors from the United Kingdom to France.
 Great Britain in the Seven Years' War

References

|-

|-

1721 births
1780 deaths
Ambassadors of Great Britain to Russia
Members of the Parliament of Great Britain for English constituencies
British MPs 1754–1761
British MPs 1761–1768
British MPs 1768–1774
British MPs 1774–1780
Politicians from the Isle of Wight
Ambassadors of Great Britain to France
British politicians who committed suicide
Diplomats from London
Lords of the Admiralty
Suicides by sharp instrument in England